The Cronartiaceae are a family of rust fungi in the order Uredinales.

They are heteroecious rusts with two alternating hosts, typically a pine and a flowering plant, and up to five spore stages. Many of the species are plant diseases of major economic importance, causing significant damage and (in some cases) heavy mortality in conifers.

References
 Hiratsuka, Y. et al. (1991). Rusts of pine. Proceedings of the IUFRO Rusts of Pine Working Party Conference. Forestry Canada Information Report NOR-X-317.

External links
 Forestry Images: photos of some Cronartiaceae rusts

Pucciniales
Cronartiaceae